Annals of Rome is a turn-based strategy video game developed by Level 9 Computing and published by Personal Software Services. It was first released in the United Kingdom for the ZX Spectrum, Amstrad CPC and Atari ST in 1986. It was then released in Germany for the Commodore 64 and Amiga in 1987 and 1988, respectively. The game is set in the late Roman Empire, with the objective being to survive for as long as possible against rebelling European states.

Gameplay

The game is played in two windows. The first is the troops movement window, which allows the player to control the placement of troops in the Roman state or to attack computer players. This window shows the number of forces for all players, inflation, popularity and national score of the Roman state, and human player score. The last step for the player in this window is to set the tax rate, between 1.0 and 2.0% (higher taxes cause higher inflation). In the next window, the player decides which of the 21 Senate members will receive command of the various Roman armies. To help the player in making this decision, all Senate members are listed with numbers, the first two indicating their military ability and loyalty, respectively. The last number indicates their age. If the government's popularity falls below 2 (popularity is measured within a range between -5 and +5), armies with disloyal commanders can revolt and try to take Rome. If this happens before 50 BC, the successful rebel will be declared dictator, and if this happens after, he will become emperor, which will lead to a dynasty.

Background
Personal Software Services was founded in Coventry, England, by Gary Mays and Richard Cockayne in November 1981. The company was known for creating games that revolved around historic battles and conflicts, such as Theatre Europe, Bismarck and Falklands '82. The company had a partnership with French video game developer ERE Informatique, and published localised versions of their products in the United Kingdom. The Strategic Wargames series was conceptualised by software designer Alan Steel in 1984. During development of these titles, Steel would often research the topic of the upcoming game and pass on the findings to other associates in Coventry and London. Some games of the series were met with controversy upon release, such as Theatre Europe. In 1983, the company received recognition for being "one of the top software houses" in the United Kingdom, and was a finalist for BBC Radio 4's New Business Enterprise Award for that year.

In 1986, Cockayne took a decision to alter their products for release on 16-bit consoles, as he found that smaller 8-bit consoles, such as the ZX Spectrum, lacked the processing power for larger strategy games. The decision was falsely interpreted as "pulling out" from the Spectrum market by video game journalist Phillipa Irving. Following years of successful sales throughout the mid-1980s, Personal Software Services experienced financial difficulties, with Cockayne admitting in a retrospective interview that "he took his eye off the ball". The company was acquired by Mirrorsoft in February 1987, and was later dispossessed by the company due to strains of debt.

Reception

Despite poor graphics and interface even for 1986, Annals of Rome received an 85% rating from Crash magazine in 1987. In November 1986, Popular Computing Weekly called the game a "perfect choice if you take your strategy games seriously". Because of such popularity, the game received conversion to all computer platforms in its day. Originally, Personal Software Services released the game for C-64, Spectrum, Amstrad CPC and Atari ST (platforms until September 1987) followed by versions for PC and Amiga. Today, the game has been considered a forgotten classic.

Computer Gaming World gave the game a positive review, noting innovative mechanics such as the variable turn length. The review noted that the game felt unfinished and unpolished, citing the lack of victory conditions and poor save mechanism. In 1990 the magazine gave the game three-plus out of five stars, stating that despite the poor graphics and seemingly incomplete nature, "it succeeds on many levels", especially the superior 16-bit versions. In 1993 the magazine gave the game two-plus stars. Orson Scott Card wrote in Compute! that Annals of Romes programmers did an excellent job of recreating Roman history, but that sales would suffer because it "looks like it was programmed in the Bronze Age".

References

1986 video games
Amiga games
Amstrad CPC games
Atari ST games
Commodore 64 games
DOS games
Turn-based strategy video games
War video games set in Europe
ZX Spectrum games
Video games set in the Roman Empire
Video games set in antiquity
Personal Software Services games
Video games developed in the United Kingdom
Single-player video games